Victor Gadzekpo is a Ghanaian academic and administrator. He was the Vice Chancellor of the University of Cape Coast and served as the President of the Central University of Ghana.

He holds a PhD in Analytical Chemistry from the University of Washington, Seattle, USA, from the same university, he earned a Master of Science degree. He was also at the University of Cape Coast where he obtained two degrees, Bachelor of Science degree in Education and  Bachelor of Science degree in chemistry.

References

Living people
Vice-Chancellors of the University of Cape Coast
Ghanaian Christians
Academic staff of Central University, Ghana
Academic staff of the University of Cape Coast
People from Volta Region
Year of birth missing (living people)